Marlin may refer to the following people:

Given name

Male
Marlin Barnes (died 1996), American linebacker
Marlin Briscoe (born 1945), American professional football wide receiver
Marlin Carter (1912-1993), American baseball player
Marlin Cannon (born 1970), American sprinter
Marlin Chinn (born 1970), American basketball coach
Marlin Darrah, American director
Marlin Eller, American programmer
Marlin Fitzwater (born 1942), White House Press Secretary under presidents Ronald Reagan and George H. W. Bush
Marlin Hurt (1905–1946), American stage entertainer and radio actor
Marlin Ikenberry (born 1973), American baseball coach
Marlin Jackson (born 1983), American football defensive back
Marlin K. Jensen (born 1942), American Mormon missionary
Marlin Kuykendall, American former mayor of Prescott, Arizona
Marlin Lane (born 1991), American football running back
Marlin Maddoux (1933-2004), American radio broadcaster
Marlin McKeever (1940-2006), American football player
Marlin Edgar Olmsted (1847-1913), American representative
Marlin Perkins (1905–1986), American zoologist and TV personality
Marlin T. Phelps (1881-1964), American justice
Marlin Piana (born 1982), Congolese footballer 
Marlin Schmidt (born 1978), Canadian politician
Marlin Schneider (born 1942), Democratic Party member of the Wisconsin State Assembly
Marlin Skiles (1906-1981), American composer
Marlin Stuart (1918–1994), American Major League Baseball relief pitcher
Marlin Stutzman (born 1976), American politician

Female
Marlin Maldonado (born 1985), Guatemalan badminton player

Surname
Alice Tepper Marlin, President and CEO of Social Accountability International
Bob Marlin (born 1959), American basketball coach 
Brigid Marlin (born 1936), American artist 
Calvin Marlin (born 1976), South African football player
Coo Coo Marlin (1932–2005), American NASCAR driver; father of Sterling Marlin
Davey Marlin-Jones (1932–2004), American stage director and television personality
Franck Marlin (born 1964), member of the National Assembly of France
Jean Marlin (1833–1872), a sergeant of the French 8th Battalion of infantry
John Marlin (disambiguation), several people
Lene Marlin (born 1980), Norwegian musician
Leona Marlin-Romeo (born 1973), 5th Prime Minister of Sint Maarten
Mike Marlin (born 1961), British singer-songwriter
Randal Marlin (born 1938), Canadian professor of philosophy
Renee Marlin-Bennett (born 1959), American political scientist
Steadman Marlin (born 1980), American NASCAR driver, son of Sterling
Sterling Marlin (born 1957), American NASCAR driver
William Marlin (born 1950), 3rd Prime Minister of Sint Maarten

See also
 Marlon
 Marlene (given name)